The Historic Preservation Commission of the Village of Williamsville, New York is a governmental organization empowered to designate historic landmarks and districts within the village's boundaries. As of September 2021, there are 34 such landmarks in the village, all of which are individual properties as opposed to districts.

Historic Preservation Commission 

Williamsville's Historic Preservation Commission was created under the auspices of Local Law No. 4 of 1983 with the power to identify, publicize, and promote the preservation of "places, sites, structures and buildings of historic or architectural significance, antiquity, uniqueness of exterior design or construction... to maintain the architectural character of the Village, to contribute to the aesthetic value of the Village and to promote the general good, welfare, health and safety of the Village and its residents".

Landmark designation

The criteria used by the Commission to recommend historic designation differ slightly based on whether the proposed landmark is an individual property or a historic district. In the case of individual properties, nominees must either possess "historic or aesthetic interest... as part of the political, economic, or social history" of the village, state, or nation, embody "the distinguishing characteristics of a type, period or method of construction or design style, or [be] a valuable example of the use of indigenous materials or craftsmanship; or [be] representative of the work of a designer, architect or builder", represent "an established and familiar visual feature of the community by virtue of its unique location or singular physical characteristic", or "ha[ve] yielded or... be likely to yield information important in prehistory or history". In addition to all of the foregoing, the properties in a proposed historic district must also generally coalesce coherently so as to be considered "a unique section of the Village by reason of possessing those qualities that would satisfy such criteria."

Somewhat unusually, building interiors are also specifically called out by village law as a separate category of historic landmark. The criteria for designation of interior landmarks is similar to the above, with the additional stipulation that the space must be "customarily open or accessible to the public".

Upon being designated as a landmark (or a contributing property to a landmark district), the issuance by the Commission of a Certificate of Appropriateness is required for any future "exterior alteration, restoration, rehabilitation, or construction activity". Ordinarily, this entails the requirement that "features which contribute to the character of the individual landmark or historic district... be retained", and that any "new construction... be compatible with the property on which it is located" (as well as with other contributing properties in the historic district if it's part of one) in terms of architectural design, construction materials, scale, and general appearance.

List of Local Landmarks

See also

National Register of Historic Places in Erie County, New York

External links

Williamsville Historic Preservation Commission

References 

Buildings and structures in Erie County, New York
Williamsville